Parides ascanius, the Fluminense swallowtail, is a species of butterfly in the family Papilionidae. It is endemic to Brazil where it is confined to the municipalities of Atafona (São João da Barra) and Itaguaí.

Description
Parides ascanius has a spatulate tail. The two sexes are similar. The male has on the hindwing a hindmarginal fold, covered with white wool. A broad white band traverses both wings; on the hindwing it is more or less red. The larva is light brown, and bears pointed tubercles on all the segments. A full description is provided by Rothschild, W. and Jordan, K. (1906)

Biology
Parides ascanius larvae are found from October to April, feeding only on Aristolochia macroura in its preferred wetland habitats. Adults fly all year. The  favourite flower of the nectar feeding adults is Lantana camara (Verbenaceae)

Taxonomy

Parides ascanius is a member of the ascanius species group

The members are
Parides agavus (Drury, 1782)
Parides alopius (Godman & Salvin, [1890]) 
Parides ascanius (Cramer, [1775]) 
Parides bunichus (Hübner, [1821])
Parides gundlachianus (C. & R. Felder, 1864) 
Parides montezuma (Westwood, 1842) 
Parides phalaecus (Hewitson, 1869)
Parides photinus (Doubleday, 1844) 
Parides proneus (Hübner, [1831])

Etymology
It is named in the classical tradition. In Roman mythology Ascanius is a legendary king. The common name, "Fluminense", is the demonym for residents of the state of Rio de Janeiro, Brazil.

Sources

References

Lewis, H.L. (1974). Butterflies of the World  Page 26, figure 2.

Further reading
Otero, L.S.; Brown, K.S. Jr. (1986). Biology and ecology of Parides ascanius (Cramer, 1775) (Lep., Papilionidae), a primitive butterfly threatened with extinction  Atala 10. Dez, pp. [2-16, 11 figs., 3 tabs.]

Lepidoptera of Brazil
Parides
Endemic fauna of Brazil
Taxonomy articles created by Polbot
Butterflies described in 1775